Bačko Dušanovo is a village in Serbia. It is situated in the Subotica municipality, in the North Bačka District, Vojvodina province. The village has a Hungarian ethnic majority and its population numbering 741 people (2002 census).

Ethnic groups (2002 census)
Hungarians = 463 (62.48%)
Serbs = 239 (32.25%)
Yugoslavs = 12 (1.62%)
others.

Historical population
1961: 1,011
1971: 938
1981: 839
1991: 785
2002: 741

See also
List of places in Serbia
List of cities, towns and villages in Vojvodina

References
Popis stanovništva, domaćinstava i stanova 2002. Knjiga 1: Nacionalna ili etnička pripadnost po naseljima. Republika Srbija, Republički zavod za statistiku Beograd 2003. 
Slobodan Ćurčić, Broj stanovnika Vojvodine, Novi Sad, 1996.

Places in Bačka
Subotica
Hungarian communities in Serbia